Illini Township is located in Macon County, Illinois. As of the 2010 census, its population was 1,469 and it contained 621 housing units.

Cities and towns 
 Heman
 Warrensburg

Adjacent townships 
 Austin Township (north)
 Maroa Township (northeast)
 Hickory Point Township (east)
 Decatur Township (southeast)
 Harristow Township (south)
 Niantic Township (southwest and west)
 Lake Fork Township, Logan County (west)
 Laenna Township, Logan County (northwest)

Geography

Demographics

References

External links
City-data.com
Illinois State Archives

Townships in Macon County, Illinois
1864 establishments in Illinois
Townships in Illinois